TreapDB  is a kind of NoSQL data store, and it is based on Treap data structure. Treap is a randomized balanced search tree, which  has O(log(n)) complexity to insert or find a key. TreapDB supports many operations besides "get" and "set". For example, "prefix foo" fetch all the pairs whose key startswith "foo". TreapDB can be used in two ways: embedded library or standalone server.

TreapDB is sponsored by Sino-German Joint Laboratory of Software Integration.

References

External links
 

Cross-platform software
Structured storage
Free database management systems